Love, Honor and Oh-Baby! is a 1940 American comedy film directed by Charles Lamont and written by Clarence Upson Young. The film stars Wallace Ford, Mona Barrie, Donald Woods, Kathryn Adams Doty, Warren Hymer and Marc Lawrence. The film was released on June 7, 1940, by Universal Pictures.

Plot

Cast     
Wallace Ford as Joe Redmond
Mona Barrie as Deedee Doree   
Donald Woods as Brian McGrath
Kathryn Adams Doty as Susan
Warren Hymer as Bull
Marc Lawrence as Tony Luffo
Hobart Cavanaugh as 'Gimpy' Darnell
Eddy Waller as Panhandler
Irving Bacon as Taxi Driver
Frank Puglia as Headwaiter
Thomas E. Jackson as District Attorney 
Vinton Hayworth as Man with Susan
Matt McHugh as Taxi Driver
Robert Frazer as Investigator
David Oliver as Taxi Driver

References

External links
 

1940 films
American comedy films
1940 comedy films
Universal Pictures films
Films directed by Charles Lamont
American black-and-white films
1940s English-language films
1940s American films